American Fur Co. v. United States, 27 U.S. (2 Pet.) 358 (1829), was a United States Supreme Court case in which the Court held that the American Fur Company agent's acts and statements bound the company; that all goods were subject to seizure and forfeiture; but that the instructions on where in Indian territory the seizure could be made was in error to the point that a new trial was required.

Background 
On September 24, 1824, a licensed Indian trader, William H. Wallace, was caught with seven kegs of whiskey and one keg of shrub among his goods he had for trade with the Indians. The local District Attorney moved for the district court to forfeit all of the goods to the government, and following a trial in which John Davis, an employee of Wallace, testified about the alcohol, the jury agreed and forfeited the goods to government.

Supreme Court 

Justice Bushrod Washington delivered the opinion of the Court. Washington noted that Davis was an agent of Wallace, and that his statements could bind the principal. He further stated that all of the goods were subject to seizure, not just the alcohol, but that the instructions as to the location of the seizure to the jury was so confusing that a new trial was required.

References

External links
 

1829 in United States case law
United States Supreme Court cases
United States Supreme Court cases of the Marshall Court
American Fur Company